Schloss Eichtersheim, formerly also Schloß Eichtersheim is a manor house situated in Eichtersheim, Baden-Württemberg, Germany.

Origins
The manor was first built in the sixteenth century when it served as a private home. It is entirely surrounded by a moat. A sandstone bridge leads to the main entrance. The manor is surrounded by simplistic gardens that are almost wood-like.

Schloss Rheydt Today
The manor was purchased by the town of Angelbachtal from the last private owner of the manor in the 1980s.
Since then the manor has undergone both interior and exterior restoration. Since the purchase by the town of Angelbachtal vast parts of Schloss Rheydt have been converted into office space as the manor now accommodates the townhall.

Events
Due to the size of the manor gardens various local events now take place in or outside the manor, such as:
Whitsun market with lighting of the castle park
Jousting and mediaeval fair
Pottery and artists market
Castle park serenade
Highland games
Christmas market

External links
 Schloss Eichtersheim website (German)

Landmarks in Germany